= Nigeria and the International Monetary Fund =

Nigeria joined the IMF on March 30, 1961. Nigeria is Africa's most populous country, with 222.182 million citizens. The nation's IMF quota stands at 2454.5 million (SDR) along with its special drawing rights amounting to 3702.34 million (SDR). As of July 2023, Nigeria experienced a 3.2 GDP change. Moreover, as of 2023, Nigeria has an outstanding IMF credit of 2,147,687,500, with 306,812,500 made in repayments.

== Nigeria's Oil Crisis and Balance of Payment ==
In the 1970s, the Nigerian economy shifted away from agriculture to a more singular economic model centered on oil production. Agriculture's contribution to GDP rapidly fell from around 40 percent in the 1970s to merely 20 percent in the 1980s. Consequently, as Nigeria grows increasingly reliant on the oil and gas sector, which serves as the largest contributor to government revenues and a large portion of its total exports, it is often subjected to the volatility of the petroleum market. As of 2021, Nigeria held the position of being the world's sixth-largest producer of natural gas. Due to external international forces, including the Russian invasion of Ukraine and COVID-19, and internal forces such as high oil subsidies, economic inefficiencies, and plunging oil prices, Nigeria has sought the assistance of the IMF on several occasions. Since the beginning of Nigeria's relationship with the IMF, it has participated in five loan arrangements.

During the mid and late 1980's, Nigeria experienced a prolonged and severe economic downturn. Nigeria suffered a rapid plummet of its foreign reserves from $10 billion in early 1980s to approximately $1 billion in the mid 1980s due to overvalued currency, inflated imports, and international decline of oil prices. In 1986 under General Ibrahim Babangida's rule, Nigeria initiated its first IMF loan request under the conditions of a Structural Adjustment Program (SAP). SAP refers to the conditionality attached to an IMF loan given to a country, implemented to ensure that the country will establish institutional changes and economic reforms that will facilitate timely repayment. In July 1986, the structural adjustment program was established under several conditions: First, reduce Nigeria's dependence on the oil sector. Second, maintain a medium term balance of payment. Third, construct a minimal non-inflationary economic growth structure. And lastly, aim to reduce unproductive investments. These stipulations were attempts to promote domestic production, decrease dependency on the oil market, and lessen import needs.

Since 1987, Nigeria has participated in IMF loan arrangements on February 3, 1989, January 9, 1991, August 4, 2000, and most recently, in 2020, a $3.4 billion IMF loan, reaching 100 percent of its national quota. Ultimately, in 1986, Nigeria decided against supporting the $2.4 billion loan from the IMF due to political tensions and the domestic resistance against the IMF's conditions to eliminate the petroleum subsidy and to devalue the naira.

== COVID-19 and Russian-Ukraine War ==
Nigeria received an RFI emergency loan for economic losses incurred due to COVID-19, which is to be repaid within 5 years, and repayments beginning within the third year. The RFI loan was conditioned upon the nation's adherence to transparency and participation in independent audits of crisis-mitigation. Moreover, Nigeria agreed to publish emergency expenses to ensure the loan was being utilized for its specified purpose. There was a severe drop in international demand and oil prices by 2020, resulting in exports decline of more than US$26 billion.

In June 2022, under the leadership of IMF's Mission Chief in Nigeria, Jesmin Rahman, convened several meetings assessing the present condition of the Nigerian economy following COVID-19, the 2020 RFI loan, and the repercussions of the Russia-Ukraine war. In May 2022, inflation grew to 17.7 percent, creating new economic and social concerns, particularly among the over 40 percent of the Nigerian population that live below the poverty line and face severe food insecurity.
